Stevan Jackson (born 9 March 1970) is a former Australian rules footballer who played for the West Coast Eagles and Richmond in the Australian Football League.

Playing career
Jackson began his senior playing career with South Fremantle where he played 41 West Australian Football League matches.

In the 1988 VFL Draft, Jackson was a pre-draft selection by the West Coast Eagles

Coaching career
After retiring, Jackson took up coaching with Blackburn in the Eastern Football League. He has since had stints with Wantirna South, South Mandurah and Warnbro.

References

External links

1970 births
Australian rules footballers from Western Australia
Indigenous Australian players of Australian rules football
Richmond Football Club players
West Coast Eagles players
South Fremantle Football Club players
Living people